Berney Arms Windmill is a tower mill located at Berney Arms alongside the River Yare at the south-western end of Breydon Water in the English county of Norfolk.
The mill has no road access but can be accessed by boat, by foot or from Berney Arms railway station. It is a scheduled monument under the care of English Heritage.

Description
It is constructed from red brickwork with the outside sloping walls coated with tar. The mill tower stands seven storeys high. The cap resembles an upturned clinker boat hull and is a traditional style for Norfolk. The windmill has four sails and a fantail. The mill's scoop wheel stands some way from the mill, which is unusual. The paddles scooped water into a narrow brick-built culvert and released it to the higher level of the River Yare.

History
The windmill was built in 1865 for the Reedham Cement Company by the millwright firm of Stolworthy on the site of a previous mill. It was initially used to grind cement clinker, using chalk from Whitlingham near Norwich and clay dredged from Oulton Broad or Breydon Water, both brought to the mill by wherry. These materials were fired at nearby kilns. The kilns produced a clinker which was ground to a powder in the windmill. At this time the cement works supported a small settlement with 11 inhabited houses and a chapel.

Cement production closed down in 1880 and in 1883 the windmill was converted into a drainage mill to drain the surrounding marshland. The mill closed in 1948 when it was replaced by motor pumps. It was given to the Ministry of Works in 1951 and restoration begun in 1967.

The windmill today
The windmill is a scheduled monument under the care of English Heritage. It underwent a lengthy restoration programme starting in 1999 when the sails were removed along with the cap and fantail. After a long period without them the cap was replaced during 2003, the fantail on 22 April 2006 and finally the sails on 25 May 2007. During the Summer of 2009 English Heritage, in partnership with a local boat touring company, re-opened the mill on a limited basis on a number of Mondays. It is now only open to pre-booked group tours.  RSPB volunteers, on behalf of English Heritage, have opened the mill on the last Sunday of each month during 2016 and intend to do so in coming years during the summer months.

References

External links

Berney Arms Windmill at Berney Arms Web
Berney Arms Windmill at English Heritage

Windmills in Norfolk
English Heritage sites in Norfolk
Windmills of the Norfolk Broads
Tower mills in the United Kingdom
Windmills completed in 1865
Scheduled monuments in Norfolk
Broadland